Milotski Breg is a village in the municipality of Gračišće in Istria, Croatia.

According to the 2001 Croatian census, the village had 113 inhabitants and 35 family households.

References

Populated places in Istria County